
The abbreviation SAFC or S.A.F.C. usually refers to Sunderland A.F.C., an English football (soccer) team competing in the English Football League. It may also refer to:

Other football teams

United Kingdom
Scarborough Athletic F.C., an English football (soccer) team
Stirling Albion F.C. a football (soccer) team competing in the Scottish Football League
Sunderland Albion F.C., a defunct football (soccer) team
Sutton Athletic F.C., an English non-league football team

Elsewhere
San Antonio FC, a soccer team in the (American) United Soccer League, based in Texas
South Adelaide Football Club, an Australian rules football team competing in the South Australian National Football League

Other uses
Sigma-Aldrich Fine Chemicals, a subdivision of Sigma-Aldrich, an U.S. supplier of chemical materials
South Australian Film Corporation, a South Australian state government statutory corporation that produces films and promotes the industry